Neyla may refer to;

Neyla Pekarek (born 1986), American musician
"Neyla", a 2012 song by Fady Maalouf 
Constable Neyla, a fictional character in Sly Cooper

See also

Naila (disambiguation)
Naila (name)
Nayla, a given name